Mojca Kumerdej (born 1964) is a Slovene writer, philosopher and critic. She works as the cultural chronicler for the daily newspaper Delo.

Biography 
Kumerdej graduated in philosophy and sociology of culture from the University of Ljubljana. Her debut novel Krst nad Triglavom (The Baptism over Mount Triglav) is a parody and a witty and ironical revision of one of Slovene literary history's most important works, the epic poem Krst pri Savici (The Baptism at the Savica) by France Prešeren. Her next two published books, Fragma and Temna snov, are collections of short stories. Her stories have
been translated into many languages and have been published in various Slovene and foreign literary journals and anthologies.

In 2017, Kumerdej received a Prešeren Fund Award for her second novel Kronosova žetev.

Published works
 Krst nad Triglavom (The Baptism over Mount Triglav), novel, (2001)
 Fragma (Fragma), short stories, (2003)
 Temna snov (Dark Matter), short stories, (2011)
 Kronosova žetev (Chronos' Harvest), novel (2016)

References

20th-century Slovenian philosophers
Slovenian women short story writers
Slovenian short story writers
Living people
1964 births
Slovenian women philosophers
University of Ljubljana alumni
21st-century Slovenian philosophers
21st-century short story writers
20th-century Slovenian women writers
20th-century Slovenian writers
21st-century Slovenian women writers
21st-century Slovenian writers